Tony Montana is a fictional character, the main protagonist  of the 1983 film  Scarface 

Tony Montana may also refer to:
 Tony Montana (filmmaker), American filmmaker
 Tony Montana, bass player in the band Great White
 "Tony Montana" (song), on rapper Future's 2012 album Pluto 
 "Tony Montana", song on rapper Agust D's 2016 mixtape Agust D
 Tony Reflex (born 1963), American punk rock singer also known as Tony Montana

See also
 Toni Montano (born 1962), Serbian rock singer-songwriter